The 2002 WNBA All-Star Game was played on July 15, 2002 at MCI Center in Washington, D.C. This was the 4th annual WNBA All-Star Game.

The All-Star Game

Rosters

1 Injured
2 Injury replacement
3 Starting in place of injured player

Coaches
The coach for the Western Conference was Los Angeles Sparks coach Michael Cooper. The coach for the Eastern Conference was Charlotte Sting coach Anne Donovan.

References

Wnba All-star Game, 2002
Women's National Basketball Association All-Star Game